Jugend der Welt. Der Film von den IV. Olympischen Winterspielen in Garmisch-Partenkirchen (English:"Youth of the World. The Film of the Fourth Olympic Winter Games in Garmisch-Partenkirchen") is the official film of the 1936 Winter Olympics in Garmisch-Partenkirchen, Bavaria, Germany.

See also 
Olympia (1938 film)

External links 

filmportal.de profile

Documentary films about the Olympics
1936 documentary films
1936 films
German documentary films
Films of Nazi Germany
Films about the 1936 Winter Olympics
German black-and-white films
1930s German films